The Woman is a 1915 American silent drama film directed by George Melford and starring Theodore Roberts, James Neill, Ernest Joy, Raymond Hatton, Mabel Van Buren, and Tom Forman. Based on a play by William C. deMille, the film was released on May 3, 1915, by Paramount Pictures.

Plot
Senator Jim Blake and his son-in-law Mark Robertson hires an investigator to find dirt on Senator Matthew Standish, their political opponent. 
The investigator finds that, years earlier, Standish had spent a night in a hotel with a stranger whom the former senator's secretary, bribed by the detective, describes only as "a lady from a good family". Blake and Robertson try in every way to find out who the woman may be - and approach Wanda Kelly, a receptionist, to help them discover her name.  Wanda learns that Grace, the mysterious woman, is Blake's daughter also Robertson's wife; she then destroys the evidence in her possession and refuses their bribe, even when threatened with arrest. Grace, realizing the troubles the girl could face because of him, confesses. Wanda, for her determination and honesty, arouses the admiration of Blake who does not pose any obstacles to the love story between her and her son.

Cast 
Theodore Roberts as The Hononorable Jim Blake
James Neill as The Honorable Mark Robertson
Ernest Joy as The Hononorable Matthew Standish
Raymond Hatton as Secretary
Mabel Van Buren as Grace Robertson
Tom Forman as Tom Blake
Helen Hill as New England Maid
Dr. Beitel as Detective
Lois Meredith as Wanda Kelly

Preservation status
Prints of The Woman survive in the Hungarian National Film Archive and the BFI National Film and Television Archive.

References

External links 
 
 

1915 films
1910s English-language films
Silent American drama films
1915 drama films
Paramount Pictures films
Films directed by George Melford
American black-and-white films
American silent feature films
American films based on plays
1910s American films